Shadow Brook, also known as East Springfield Brook, is a river in northern Otsego County in the U.S. State of New York. It begins north-northeast of the Hamlet of East Springfield, and flows into Otsego Lake south-southeast of the Hamlet of Springfield Center, near Glimmerglass State Park. It is the largest watershed in the Otsego Lake basin.

History 
Shadow Brook flows under the historic Hyde Hall Bridge, a covered bridge that was built in 1825. The bridge consists of a single  span using a Burr Arch Truss and was constructed by master carpenter Cyrenus Clark with assistance from carpenter Andrew Alden and stonemason Lorenzo Bates. Renovations to the bridge were performed by the State of New York in 1967. It is one of 29 historic covered bridges in New York State.

Fishing
Suckers can be speared and taken from the creek from January 1 to May 15, each year.

References

Rivers of New York (state)
Rivers of Otsego County, New York